The  is a public transport company in Kumamoto Prefecture, Japan. The company was founded in 1909. The company operates railway and bus lines.

Lines
Kikuchi Line (菊池線)
Kami-Kumamoto — Miyoshi: 
 Fujisaki Line (藤崎線)
Kita-Kumamoto — Fujisakigū-mae: 
A short section of the Fujisaki Line shares its track with public road, like a tram line.

Rolling stock
 200 series EMU (former Nankai 22000 series)
 5000 series EMUs (former Tokyu 5000 series)
 6000 series 2-car EMUs (former Toei 6000 series)
 01 series 2-car EMUs (former Tokyo Metro 01 series, since March 2015)
 03 series EMUs (former Tokyo Metro 03 series) since May 2019.

Three former Tokyo Metro 03 series EMU trains were purchased and introduced on the line between 2018 and 2020.

History

From 31 August 1923, the line was converted to  gauge and electrified at 600 V DC.

The current section of the Kikuchi Line between Kita-Kumamoto and Kami-Kumamoto opened on 1 October 1950, resulting in two lines between those stations, the original via Fujisakigū-mae and the new line. In June 1953 the original line from Kami-Kumamoto to Fujisakigū-mae closed. The 13.5 km Miyoshi to Kikuchi section closed on 16 February 1986 due to falling patronage.

See also
List of railway companies in Japan

References

External links 
  

Companies based in Kumamoto Prefecture
Japanese companies established in 1909
Rail transport in Kumamoto Prefecture
Railway companies established in 1909
Railway companies of Japan